Benjamin Moore & Co., also known as Benjamin Moore, is an American manufacturer of premium and commercial paints, stains and other architectural coatings. The company was founded in 1883 in Brooklyn, N.Y., and is currently headquartered in Montvale, N.J. Benjamin Moore has major manufacturing and distribution operations throughout the United States and Canada with global sales in more than 75 other countries. Benjamin Moore products have always been sold through independently owned retailers, including specialized paint-and-decorating centers, hardware stores, and retailers’ cooperatives such as Ace Hardware, Do it Best and True Value.

Company founder, Benjamin Moore, was born in Ballybay, County Monaghan in Ireland in 1855. In 1872, Moore immigrated to the United States and settled in Brooklyn, N.Y. After working in the paint industry, Benjamin and his brother, William, founded Moore Brothers in 1883 with an initial investment of approximately $2,000. The company set up operations in a warehouse on Atlantic Avenue in Brooklyn and sold "Moore's Prepared Calsom Finish.” Soon after, William left and another brother, Robert Moore, joined. The company was incorporated as Benjamin Moore in 1889. Benjamin Moore & Co., Limited was established in Canada in 1906. In 1917, Benjamin Moore stepped down at 62 and named his nephew, L.P. Moore, as his successor. In 2000, Benjamin Moore was acquired by Berkshire Hathaway.

Innovations
In 1982, Benjamin Moore introduced one of the industry’s first-ever computerized color-matching systems, expanding color choice beyond color chips.

In 1992, Benjamin Moore opened its research and development facility on 90 acres in Flanders, N.J., including a five-acre outdoor test farm housing more than 2,500 test boards of more than 70 different substrate types, systematically coated with both Benjamin Moore and competitor products for long-term, brand-blind observation.

In 2007, Benjamin Moore introduced Gennex® Color Technology, a combination of proprietary colorant and proprietary resin systems that work together to remove surfactants, thus enhancing color performance and durability while adding zero volatile organic compounds.

Awards
2020 Awarded Best in Customer Satisfaction among Interior Paints by J.D. Power: #1 in Durability, #1 in Application, #1 in Offerings

Owned Properties
Benjamin Moore offers trademarked lines of premium and commercial interior and exterior paints and stains marketed under the Benjamin Moore brand. Its longest-running sub-brand, Regal®, was introduced in 1957. Benjamin Moore removed lead from Regal formulations in 1968, ten years before the United States banned lead paint for residential and interior use.

Benjamin Moore currently owns Insl-X®, Coronado® and Lenmar®. In 2008, Benjamin Moore acquired Insl-X, a brand that includes field-marking paint, masonry coatings, specialty primers, swimming pool paint, and traffic paint. Insl-X had already acquired Coronado and Lenmar in 2004. Coronado includes value-driven interior and exterior paint and stain, and Lenmar includes wood finishes.6 Benjamin Moore manufactures and markets commercial-use enamels, epoxies, and other specialty coatings under its Corotech line.

References 

1. Centers for Disease Control and Prevention, Childhood Lead Poisoning Prevention.
2. NorthJersey.com. “Benjamin Moore's R&D facility benefits from New Jersey's four seasons.” (December, 2018).
3. Azure Magazine. “Benjamin Moore’s Gennex Paints Pair Vivid Hues With Unparalleled Durability.” (July 2020).

Berkshire Hathaway
Paint and coatings companies of the United States
Retail companies of the United States
Manufacturing companies based in New Jersey
Companies based in Bergen County, New Jersey
Montvale, New Jersey
American companies established in 1883
Chemical companies established in 1883
Retail companies established in 1883
2000 mergers and acquisitions
1883 establishments in New Jersey